The Valea Sălașelor is a right tributary of the river Iara in Romania. It flows into the Iara in Moara de Pădure.

References

Rivers of Romania
Rivers of Cluj County